Avīci or Avici (Sanskrit and Pali for "without waves";  or ;  or) is one of the hells (naraka) in Hinduism and Buddhism. In Hinduism, it is one of the twenty-eight hells located in the kingdom of Yama, where individuals are reborn for bearing false witness and outright lying while transacting business or giving charity. In Buddhism, it is the lowest level of the Naraka or "hell" realm, with the most suffering, into which the dead who have committed grave misdeeds may be reborn. It is said to be a cube 20,000 yojanas (240,000 to 300,000 kilometers) on each side, buried deep underneath the divine (nonvisible) earth. Avīci is often translated into English as "interminable" or "incessant", referring to suffering without periods of respite, although it is believed to be ultimately impermanent.

Avīci-punishable offenses/transgressions
People reborn in  have generally committed one or more of the Five Anantarika-karma ("Grave Offenses"):

 Intentionally killing one's father. 
 Intentionally killing one's mother.
 Killing an arhat (enlightened being).
 Shedding the blood of a Buddha.
 Creating a schism within the sangha (the community of Buddhist monks, nuns, and laypeople who try to attain enlightenment).

Details about Avīci
Buddhism teaches that going to Naraka is temporary, allowing the offenders to work off the karma they garnered in life.  is sometimes cited as lasting 3.39738624×1018 or 339,738,624×1010 years, about 3.4 quintillion years.

Some sutras state that rebirth in  will be for innumerable kalpas (aeons). When the offending soul passes away after one kalpa, it is reborn in the same place, suffering for another kalpa, and on and on until it has exhausted its bad karma. For this reason, the  hell is also known as the "nonstop way".

Nichiren famously wrote that Buddhist monks who ignored the passages in the Lotus Sutra, which claimed superiority over other sutras, would fall into .

If anyone correctly follows the teachings of Buddha, they will be able to attain enlightenment without going to any hell even if they have accumulated a vast amount of negative karma (excluding Anantarika-karma).

There are many stories of people who have accumulated negative karma but avoided all the levels of Naraka because they attained enlightenment before their karma ripened. If one has Anantarika-karma, he will not be able to attain enlightenment in this life because this negative karma will ripen immediately.

Buddhism accepts the principle of anattā, according to which there is no concept of self. Consequences are results of actions that are brought by in an impersonal manner described with the concept of karma. There is no supernatural being applying its own will to determine someone's fate: "[...] beings are owners of kamma, heir to kamma, born of kamma, related through kamma, and have kamma as their arbitrator. Kamma is what creates distinctions among beings in terms of coarseness & refinement."

References

Locations in Buddhist mythology
Buddhist cosmology
Naraka